is a 2013 Japanese drama film directed by Yuya Ishii, starring Ryuhei Matsuda as a dictionary editor. It is based on the best-selling novel by Shion Miura. The film won several awards, including the Japan Academy Prize for Picture of the Year, and also received several nominations. It was selected as the Japanese entry for the Best Foreign Language Film at the 86th Academy Awards, but it was not nominated.

Plot
Mitsuya Majime (Ryuhei Matsuda) is an unsuccessful salesman. But his love of reading and dedication, as well as a post-graduate degree in linguistics, catches the eyes of Masashi Nishioka (Joe Odagiri) and Kouhei Araki (Kaoru Kobayashi), dictionary editors who are seeking a replacement for Araki himself, as his wife is sick and he would like to spend more time by her bedside.

With Majime on the editing team, the group plans to produce a new dictionary called "Daitokai" (The Great Passage/大渡海) which would bridge the gap between people and the sea of words and would take years to complete.

Back at his home, the Sou-Un-Sou Rooming House, Majime meets Kaguya Hayashi (Aoi Miyazaki), his landlady's granddaughter who has just returned from culinary school. He is struck by her beauty. Upon discovering this, the chief editor Matsumoto (Go Kato) asks Majime to write the definition for the word "Love".

Cast
 Ryuhei Matsuda as Mitsuya Majime
 Aoi Miyazaki as Kaguya Hayashi
 Joe Odagiri as Masashi Nishioka
 Kaoru Kobayashi as Kohei Araki
 Go Kato as Tomosuke Matsumoto
 Haru Kuroki as Midori Kishibe
 Misako Watanabe as Take
 Chizuru Ikewaki as Remi Miyoshi
 Shingo Tsurumi as Murakoshi
 Hiroko Isayama as Kaoru Sasaki
 Kaoru Yachigusa as Chie Matsumoto
 Kazuki Namioka as Editor
 Kumiko Asō as Actress

Reception

Critical response
The Great Passage received generally favorable reviews from critics. Yvonne Teh of South China Morning Post gave the film 4 and a half out of 5 stars. James Hadfield of Time Out Tokyo gave the film 4 out of 5 stars, saying "Yuya Ishii's tale of a dictionary maker in love is genuinely charming." Screen International'''s Mark Adams writes that, "The film pays affectionate – and even old-fashioned – tribute to the world of words and dictionaries, while also finding space for a tender and slow-paced romance that would be out-of-step for a contemporary story." Gary Goldstein of Los Angeles Times'' gave the film a favorable review, noting that "it's the power of words to enlighten and connect us that remains the constant and gives this charming film its special place on the shelf."

Accolades

See also
 List of submissions to the 86th Academy Awards for Best Foreign Language Film
 List of Japanese submissions for the Academy Award for Best Foreign Language Film

References

External links
Official website

2013 films
Japanese drama films
2010s Japanese-language films
Films about lexicography
Films directed by Yuya Ishii
Films based on Japanese novels
Picture of the Year Japan Academy Prize winners
Works about book publishing and bookselling
2010s Japanese films